Liu Yun may refer to:

 Liu Yun (governor) (died 951), Later Han governor 
 Liu Yun (handballer) (born 1982), Chinese handball player 
 Liu Yun (actress) (born 1983), Chinese actress
 Liu Yun (footballer) (born 1995), Chinese footballer